Janosik: A True Story (also known as Janosik. Prawdziwa historia or Jánošík - Pravdivá história) is a Polish, Czech, Slovak historical film about Juraj Jánošík. It was directed by Agnieszka Holland and her daughter Kasia Adamik, and released in 2009.

References

External links
 

2009 films
Polish historical films
2000s Polish-language films
Slovak historical films
Films directed by Agnieszka Holland
Czech historical films
2000s historical films
Films set in the 1700s
Films set in the 1710s